Renanthera caloptera is a species in the family Orchidaceae. It was formerly the only species in the monotypic genus Ascoglossum, abbreviated Ascgm in the horticultural trade. It is endemic to Dinagat Island in the southern Philippines and is critically endangered by collection as an ornamental plant and habitat loss. Its flowers are a vivid purple.

Taxonomy 
Renanthera caloptera was described in 1882 by Heinrich Gustav Reichenbach as Saccolabium calopterum. Its name was subsequently changed to Ascoglossum caloptera by Rudolf Schlecter. Finally, based on research published by Alexander Kocyan & Andre Schuiteman, its name was changed to Renanthera caloptera.

Horticulture 
The Royal Horticultural Society uses Renanthera caloptera for hybrid registration purposes.

Before that 2014 taxonomic revision, Ascoglossum formed several different intergeneric hybrids (nothogenera):

Orchid hybrids are registered with The International Register at the Royal Horticultural Society. One primary hybrid was originated and registered by A.Kolopaking in 1989 as Renanthoglossum Nina Rach. As of 2014, this is classified as Renanthera Nina Rach.

References 

caloptera
Epiphytic orchids
Endemic orchids of the Philippines
Critically endangered flora of Asia
Flora of Mindanao
Species endangered by the pet trade
Species endangered by logging
Species endangered by slash-and-burn
Species endangered by urbanization
Species endangered by habitat fragmentation
Taxonomy articles created by Polbot
Taxobox binomials not recognized by IUCN